Septimius Antiochus (died after 273) was a Roman usurper in Syria during the 3rd century.

In 272 AD Emperor Aurelian had defeated the breakaway Kingdom of Palmyra; its king Vaballathus and his mother Zenobia were in Roman captivity. In 273 AD another rebellion against Roman rule broke out in Palmyra. The rebels first approached Aurelian's governor Marcellinus to become emperor, but he pretended to consider the offer as he sent a letter to Aurelian warning of the rebellion.  While the rebels were waiting they decided to elevate Septimius Antiochus, the reputed son of Zenobia, to the purple. Receiving Marcellinus's letter, the Emperor reacted quickly, and in the spring of 273 the city was brought back under Roman rule. Aurelian punished the city heavily, but allegedly spared Antiochus.

Antiochus claimed to be descended from Queen Cleopatra VII of Egypt, and the kings of Syria. There is some doubt as to his relationship to Zenobia. He may be unrelated, claiming kinship for political purposes; he may be her father, also named Antiochus; he may be indeed her biological son, or possibly an adopted son; he may be a son of Zenobia by someone other than Odaenathus, in which case he would have been quite young, perhaps as young as five.

References

Sources
Zosimus, Historia Nova 1,60-61

Rulers of Palmyra
Septimii
Year of birth unknown
Palmyrene Empire
3rd-century people